The Altos Hornos y Acerías de Corral was a major iron and steel industry located at the port of Corral in Chile.

The industry operated using charcoal. The remains of the industry were bought up in 1926 by Valdivian entrepreneurs who established Compañía Electro-Siderúrgica e Industrial de Valdivia, an enterprise considered the inheritor of Altos Hornos y Acerías de Corral.

References

Ironworks and steelworks in Chile
Manufacturing companies established in 1906
Defunct companies of Chile
Steel companies of Chile
Companies based in Los Ríos Region
1906 establishments in Chile
Manufacturing companies disestablished in 1926
1926 disestablishments in Chile